Operation Front Line is an initiative of U.S. Immigration and Customs Enforcement (ICE), a division of the Department of Homeland Security, that operated in the months leading up to the 2004 presidential election and through the 2005 Presidential Inauguration.

Overview
Little information about the program has been publicly revealed.  An Office of Management and Budget cost–benefit analysis described the program as carried out "to address potential vulnerabilities in immigration and trade systems relative to the national security of the United States."  An ICE spokesperson has noted that the program "focused on immigration violators that may have imposed an enhanced public safety or national security threat."

The cost of the program, the criteria used for arrest, and the overall scope of the program have not been publicly revealed.

See also
Illegal immigration to the United States

External links
 New Haven Independent story about seeking information about the program
 UPI wire story about lawsuit seeking information about the program

United States Department of Homeland Security
United States immigration law
Law enforcement operations in the United States
Immigration to the United States
History of immigration to the United States
Presidency of George W. Bush